Mahmudi (also Romanized as Maḩmūdī; also known as Ahranābād, Mahmood Abad Hoomeh, and Maḩmūdābād) is a village in Fahraj Rural District, in the Central District of Yazd County, Yazd Province, Iran. At the 2006 census, its population was 30, in 7 families.

References 

Populated places in Yazd County